A list of the films produced in Mexico in 1978 (see also 1978 in film):

References

External links

1978
Films
Mexican